People's Front may refer to:

Political organisations 
 All-Russia People's Front (Общероссийский народный фронт)
 People's Front (Argentina)
 People's Front (Canada)
 People's Front (Georgia) (სახალხო ფრონტი)
 People's Front (Iceland) (Alþýðufylkingin)
 People's Front (Mauritania) (Front Populaire)
 People's Front (Nepal) (जनमोर्चा नेपाल)
 People's Front (Peru) (Frente popular)
 People's Front (Singapore) (simplified Chinese: 人民阵线; traditional Chinese: 人民陣線; Malay: Barisan Rakyat)
 People's Front (Sweden) (Folkfronten)
 Popular Front (Tunisia) (Front populaire pour la réalisation des objectifs de la révolution)
 People's Front (Turkey) (Halk Cephesi)
 People's Front (Ukraine) (Народний фронт)
 People's Front (Yugoslavia) (Serbo-Croatian: Narodni Front; Slovenian: Ljudska fronta)

Other uses 
 People's Front of Judea and Judean People's Front, fictional organisations in Monty Python's Life of Brian

See also 
 People's Liberation Front (disambiguation)
 Popular Front (disambiguation)